Cesar Aguilar is an American politician. He is a member for the 26th district of the Arizona House of Representatives, alongside Flavio Bravo, since 2023.

Life and career 
Aguilar was born in Phoenix, Arizona. He attended Northern Arizona University.
 
In August 2022, Aguilar defeated Christian Solorio and Gil Hacohen in the Democratic primary election for the 26th district of the Arizona House of Representatives. In November 2022, he was elected along with Flavio Bravo in the general election. He assumes office in 2023.

References 

Living people
Place of birth missing (living people)
Year of birth missing (living people)
Democratic Party members of the Arizona House of Representatives
21st-century American politicians
Politicians from Phoenix, Arizona
Northern Arizona University alumni